The  is a Grade II race in Japan that is open to international horses. It is held mid February at Kyoto Racecourse in Kyoto, Japan.

The race was first run in 1942. It was not run from 1944 to 1947 due to World War II. Initially the race was run over 3,500 metres (about 2 miles or 1.5 furlongs) and the present race is run over 2,200 metres (about 11 furlongs).

Kyōto Kinen has been rated as a Grade II race since 1984 and was opened for foreign trained horses at that time, although foreign horses have never run the race until recently.

It is a popular prep race for Tenno Sho (spring). Takeshiba O, Ten Point, Biwa Hayahide and T M Opera O are horses that won both the Kyōto Kinen and the Tenno Sho. Some horses run this race before going to Dubai. In 2007, Admire Moon won this race and the Dubai Duty Free.

Autumn part 
Initially Kyōto Kinen was held twice a year in spring and autumn. The autumn race was abolished 1984 when Japanese domestic race grading was started.

Before the autumn part was abolished, some horses ran both races and five horses won both. Notably, Final Score (1954) and Sky Leader (1974) won both races in the same year.

Results and records

Most wins by a horse 
 Satono Crown (2016, 2017)

Most wins by a jockey 
 4  – Yutaka Take(2006, 2007, 2012, 2013)

Most wins by a trainer 
 5 – Hiroyoshi Matsuda (2001, 2006, 2007, 2008, 2010)

Most wins by an owner 
 2 – Riichi Kondō (2007, 2008)
 2 – Katsumi Yoshida (2002, 2007)
 2 – Hajime Satomi (2016, 2017)

Record winning time 
 2:11.5 Lovely Day (2015)

List of recent winners 

The 2021, 2022 and 2023 runnings took place at Hanshin while Kyoto was closed for redevelopment.

See also
 Horse racing in Japan
 List of Japanese flat horse races

References

External links 
Horse Racing in Japan

Turf races in Japan
Open middle distance horse races
Recurring sporting events established in 1942
1942 establishments in Japan